The 1938 All-Southern Conference football team consists of American football players chosen by the Associated Press (AP) and United Press (UP) for the All-Southern Conference football team for the 1938 college football season.

All-Southern Conference selections

Backs
 Eric Tipton, Duke (AP-1)
 Bob O'Mara, Duke (AP-1)
 Paul Shu, VMI (AP-1)
 Snuffy Stirnweiss, North Carolina (AP-1)

Ends
 Bolo Perdue, Duke (AP-1)
 Gus Goins, Clemson (AP-1)

Tackles
 Ty Coon, North Carolina State (AP-1)
 Steve Maronic, North Carolina (AP-1)

Guards
 Fred Yorke, Duke (AP-1)
 Louis Trunzo, Wake Forest (AP-1)

Centers
 Dan Hill Duke (AP-1)

Key
AP = Associated Press

UP = United Press

See also
1938 College Football All-America Team

References

All-Southern Conference football team
All-Southern Conference football teams